Colombia competed at the 1992 Summer Olympics in Barcelona, Spain. 49 competitors, 46 men and 3 women, took part in 31 events in 11 sports.

Medalists

Competitors
The following is the list of number of competitors in the Games.

Archery

After missing the 1988 archery competition, Colombia returned for its second Olympic tournament in 1992.  This time, the nation sent a female archer.  She fared no better than Juan Echavarria had eight years earlier.

Women's Individual Competition:
 Maria Echavarria – Ranking Round, 55th place (0-0)

Athletics

Men's 5.000 metres
Herder Vázquez
 Heat — 14:06.80 (→ did not advance)

Men's 10.000 metres
Herder Vázquez
 Heat — 30:07.55 (→ did not advance)

Men's Marathon
Carlos Grisales — did not finish (→ no ranking)

Men's 20 km Walk
Héctor Moreno — 1:26:23 (→ 9th place)

Women's 400 metres
Ximena Restrepo
Norfalia Carabali

Boxing

Men's Light Flyweight (– 48 kg)
 Fernando Retayud
 First Round — Lost to Erdenentsogt Tsogtjargal (MGL), 2:8

Men's Bantamweight (– 54 kg)
 Jesús Pérez
 First Round — Lost to Philippe Wartelle (FRA), 5:12

Men's Light-Welterweight (– 63,5 kg)
 Edwin Cassiani
 First Round — Lost to Héctor Vinent (CUB), 4:27

Cycling

Eight male cyclists represented Colombia in 1992.

Men's road race
José Robles
Héctor Palacio
Libardo Niño

Men's sprint
Jhon González

Men's 1 km time trial
José Velásquez

Men's individual pursuit
Alberny Vargas

Men's team pursuit
Esteban López
Fernando Sierra
Alberny Vargas
José Velásquez

Men's points race
José Velásquez

Equestrianism

Mixed Individual Jumping
Juan Carlos García
Manuel Guillermo Torres
Hugo Gamboa

Mixed Team Jumping
Juan Carlos García
Manuel Guillermo Torres
Hugo Gamboa

Fencing

Two male fencers represented Colombia in 1992.

Men's épée
 Mauricio Rivas
 Juan Miguel Paz

Football

Men's Team Competition
Preliminary round (group C)
 Lost to Spain (0-4)
 Drew with Qatar (1-1)
 Lost to Egypt (3-4)
 → Did not advance
Team Roster
 ( 1.) Miguel Angel Calero
 ( 2.) Jorge Bermudez
 ( 3.) Robeiro Moreno
 ( 4.) José Santa
 ( 5.) Victor Hugo Marulanda
 ( 6.) Hermán Gaviria
 ( 7.) Faustino Asprilla
 ( 8.) John Lozano
 ( 9.) Iván Valenciano
 (10.) Víctor Pacheco
 (11.) Carlos Alberto Uribe
 (12.) Faryd Mondragón
 (13.) Geovanis Cassiani
 (14.) John Perez
 (15.) Víctor Aristizábal
 (16.) Gustavo Restrepo
 (17.) John Jairo Mejia
 (18.) Diego Osorio
 (19.) Jairo Zulbarán
 (20.) Omar Cañas
Head coach: Hernan Dario Gomez

Shooting

Men's Air Pistol, 10 metres
Bernardo Tovar

Men's Rapid-Fire Pistol, 25 metres
Bernardo Tovar

Men's Free Pistol, 50 metres
Bernardo Tovar

Men's Running Target, 10 metres
Hernando Barrientos

Swimming

Men's 400m Freestyle
 Alejandro Bermúdez
 Heat — 4:01.66 (→ did not advance, 35th place)

Men's 1500m Freestyle
 Alejandro Bermúdez
 Heat — 16:01.77 (→ did not advance, 25th place)

Men's 200m Backstroke
 Alejandro Bermúdez
 Heat — 2:04.46 (→ did not advance, 26th place)

Men's 400m Individual Medley
 Alejandro Bermúdez
 Heat — 4:33.87 (→ did not advance, 27th place)

Weightlifting

Men's Featherweight
 José Horacio Villegas
 Roger Berrio

Men's Lightweight
 Eyne Acevedo

Men's Middleweight
 Álvaro Velasco

Wrestling

Men's Freestyle Welterweight
Romelio Salas

See also
Colombia at the 1991 Pan American Games
Sports in Colombia

References

External links
Official Olympic Reports
International Olympic Committee results database

Nations at the 1992 Summer Olympics
1992
Olympics